The Four Corners is one of many co-operative teaching and learning strategies. The activity can be useful when the teacher wants to point out the fact that not everyone in the class has the same viewpoint or that there are multiple solutions to some problems. This teaching method allows students who would not normally communicate in class to participate and communicate with their peers. This strategy encourages students to formulate their own opinions on a given topic and allows them to contribute their ideas to class discussion.

Process 
First, the four corners of the class are labeled, either with a chart or a vignette. Each corner will have an opinion, written statements, etc. Second, the teacher poses a question, or a problem to the class. The students reflect on the question without discussion. Third, the teacher invites the students to take a place at a corner that suits their opinion best by announcing "Corner". Then, the students at each corner share their views with each other, either in pairs or to the whole group gathered at that corner.

Lastly, the teacher asks the students to be ready to share their ideas, reflections, lessons, plans, and opinions with the whole class.

Critique 

Four corners is a collaborative method of teaching and learning that gives the students a platform for various cognitive and affective learnings. This strategy helps the students to think at a higher level, reflect on what they have learned in class, voice opinions safely, learn to critique on various issues, evaluate certain solutions, and communicate better. This strategy also enhances the responsibility of a student when making a conclusion or opinion.

References

Educational practices
Learning